Ganga Bahadur Dangol (born 1962) is a Nepalese judoka. He competed in the men's lightweight event at the 1988 Summer Olympics. In recent years, due to his declining health, particularly mental instability, he has gone on an indefinite hiatus from participating in competitive sports. He reportedly also has developed issues regarding incontinence.  He is also an avid chess fan.

References

External links
 

1962 births
Living people
Nepalese male judoka
Olympic judoka of Nepal
Judoka at the 1988 Summer Olympics
Place of birth missing (living people)